Beneath The Lies (also known as Beneath The Lies – The Series or just Beneath The Lies Series) is a Ugandan television drama-mystery series created by Nana Kagga Macpherson and starring Flavia Tumusiime, Natasha Sinayobye, Gaetano Kagwa, Hellen Lukoma, Rabadaba, Deedan Muyira, Cedric Babu Ndilima, Patrick Salvado Idringi and Susan Naava as regular cast members. The series was directed by Joseph Kitsha Kyasi and Tosh Gitonga. It was originally produced by Savannah MOON Productions, and Kinetic Media Group before  all production was taken over by 40Plus Productions, a production house co-owned by Nana Kagga and Cedric Babu Ndilima. It airs on Sundays at 9:30 p.m. EAT, on New Vision Group's Urban TV Uganda. 

In December 2016, the series was nominated for Best Television Series at Africa Magic Viewers' Choice Awards (AMVCAs).

Plot
Within the city of Kampala, lies a seedy underbelly of blackmail, drug trafficking, child prostitution and exploitation of women run by an unknown racket. When the lies beneath each relationship are exposed and loyalties are tested, only death and chaos can ensue.

Production
The first two episodes of the series were produced by Savannah MOON Productions in conjunction with Kinetic Management group and all the episodes were shot at different locations in Kampala. 40 Plus Productions took over the series production in 2016 starting with the third episode of the first season and at the same time MTN Uganda took over digital marketing for the TV Series. The series is the brains of Nana Kagga, a former TV presenter and actress, remembered for her roles in A Good Day to Be Black & Sexy, Star Trek and featuring in CSI: Crime Scene Investigation. The series ran for 30 minutes an episode on the 10:30 – 11 p.m. Urban TV time slot weekdays and repeated on Sundays before its hiatus.

Theft and series hiatus
In December 2014, all pre-recorded material and equipment for episodes 3–12 of season one were stolen from storage during the end of shoot wrap party. This brought the show to a very sudden hiatus after re-airing the
first and second episode.

Re-release
After the theft of BTL footage, re-shooting of the show began in January 2015. Shooting started in early 2016 with mostly a new crew consisting predominantly of Ugandans. Beneath The Lies was re-released on 31 July 2016 on Urban TV Uganda under 40 Plus Productions and MTN Uganda as its digital distributor. The show aired four more episodes after the re-release with the last episode airing on 4 September 2016, making a total of six episodes and marking the premature end of the series.

Cast
Flavia Tumusiime as Kamali Tenywa
Cedric Babu Ndilima as Mr. Stephen Amaru, Kamali's ex-husband, a powerful lawyer in Kampala. Many of the rich people are at his mercy; he safeguards their secrets.
Natasha Sinayobye as Kaitesi Munyana, Kamali's sister
Gaetano Kagwa as Abe Sakku, head of Mr. Amaru's security personnel
Rabadaba as Simon/Suna Kintu, ashrewd businessman
Hellen Lukoma as Hellen Mutungi, Mr. Stephen Amaru's secretary and former mistress
Deedan Muyira as Tracy Kintu, Suna's wife
Daniel Omara – Paul Mukasa, part of Amaru's security team
Susan Naava – Ali, hitwoman for hire and minder
Patrick Salvado Idringi as Kizito Semwanga, corrupt official
Isaac Kuddzu – Tendo Amaru, Stephen Amaru's brother
Marie Corrazon – Sarafina, Suna's step sister
Alma Sophia Nagayi as Young Kamali
Chloe Kirabo as Young Keitesi
Michael Wawuyo Jr. as Shaban, IT specialist, computer hacker
Mutebi Andrew Elvis- Officer Mande
Muheesi Baraba as David, works for Suna
Patrick Nkakalukanyi as Katumba, works for Kizito
Eleanor Nabwiso as the Kintu’s helper
Vince Musisi as Ojok as works for Kizito
Nikita Gossai as Nantale, Kizito’s wife
Elizabeth Bwamimpeke as Mama Kamali
Nana Kagga as Attorney General
Whitney Grace Najjuko as News reader
Doreen Mirembe as Mariam

Awards and nominations

List of Episodes

Series overview
{| class="wikitable" style="text-align:center"
|-
! style="padding: 0 8px;" colspan="2" rowspan="2"| Season
! style="padding: 0 8px;" rowspan="2"| Episodes
! colspan="2"| Originally aired 
|-
! style="padding: 0 8px;"| First aired
! style="padding: 0 8px;"| Last aired
|-
 |style="background: #F9BB00;"|
 | 1
 | 6
 | style="padding:0 8px;"| 
 | style="padding:0 8px;"| 
|- 
|}

Season 1

See also
The Life (2012 Film)
Yat Madit
Deception NTV
Balikoowa in the City
The Hostel

References

External links

 

Ugandan drama television series
2014 Ugandan television series debuts
2016 Ugandan television series endings
2010s Ugandan television series